Saint-Didier-en-Donjon is a commune located in the Allier department in Auvergne-Rhône-Alpes (central France).

Population

See also
Communes of the Allier department

References

Communes of Allier
Allier communes articles needing translation from French Wikipedia